Dallıca can refer to:

 Dallıca, Bartın
 Dallıca, Elâzığ
 Dallıca, Kemaliye
 Dallıca, Lice
 Dallıca, Nazilli
 Dallıca, Tercan